Goreski is a Macedonian surname. Notable people with the surname include:

Brad Goreski (born 1977), Canadian fashion stylist and television personality
Vlado Goreski (born 1958), Macedonian and Slovenian graphic artist, artist, and scenographer

Macedonian-language surnames